Arthur Jeph Parker (June 4, 1923 – December 15, 2002) was an American set decorator. He was nominated for two Academy Awards in the category Best Art Direction.

Selected filmography
Parker was nominated for two Academy Awards for Best Art Direction:
 The Shootist (1976)
 The China Syndrome (1979)

References

External links

American set decorators
1923 births
2002 deaths
Artists from Tucson, Arizona